Michael Zagaris (born February 22, 1945) is an American sports and rock and roll photographer known for his work the Oakland Athletics, San Francisco 49ers, and the 1970s Rock & Roll scene.

Early life and education 
Born in Chicago, Michael Zagaris moved to Modesto, California as a toddler. Before high school, in 1957, he would move with his family north to Redding, California. While living in Redding, Zagaris attended Enterprise High School before boarding at Bellarmine College Preparatory where his skills as a wide receiver of the school's football team earned him a scholarship to George Washington University. Zagaris graduated from George Washington University in 1967 and enrolled in Santa Clara Law School. In Law School, Zagaris worked as a speechwriter for Senator Bobby Kennedy.  Zagaris' whole life changed when he witnessed Senator Kennedy's assassination.

Rock & Roll Photography
After dropping out of Law School after one year, Zagaris began to embrace his photography hobby, finding ways to get on the field at 49ers games and backstage at concerts. While reviewing some of Zagaris' photos after a concert, Eric Clapton advised Zagaris to pursue photography as a steady gig. Throughout the 1970s, Zagaris would photograph some of the popular bands of all time, including The Grateful Dead, The Clash, Blondie, The Who, and Tom Petty.

Sports Photography
While in high school, Zagaris used to take discarded press passes from the field at Kezar Stadium and use them to gain access to the field to take photographs of the San Francisco 49ers. After years of finding his way onto the field, the 49ers made Zagaris the official team photographer in 1973. In 1981, Walter Haas bought the Oakland Athletics and Zagaris was brought in as their official team photographer. In the years since, Zagaris has photographed 34 Super Bowls, 12 World Series, and 14 MLB All-Star Games. His sports photography has graced the covers of Time Magazine and Sports Illustrated. Zagaris' sports photography is famous for its intimacy, as he gives the viewer a rare look behind the scenes in the clubhouse and the locker room to see a different side of the team.

Books

Filmography

Personal life 
Zagaris has lived in the Haight-Ashbury neighborhood in San Francisco since 1973, with his girlfriend Kristin Sundbom. Their son Ari Zagaris is an actor. Chris Isaak babysat Ari.

While growing up in Redding, Zagaris played sandlot baseball at Buck Martinez's house and American Legion baseball for the 1963 Redding Tigers, managed by Joe Hatten, with future major leaguer Bill Plummer and Gene Parent, father of Mark Parent.

References

External links
Official Instagram

Michael Zagaris Album Photography

1945 births
Living people
American photojournalists
Sports photographers
Journalists from California
George Washington University alumni